The 2006 Copa Libertadores Final was a two-legged football match-up to determine the 2006 Copa Libertadores champion.

Qualified teams

Route to the finals

Final summary

First leg

Second leg

External links
CONMEBOL's official website

Final
Copa Libertadores Finals
Copa Libertadores Final 2006
Copa Libertadores Final 2006
Libertadores
Brazilian football clubs in international competitions

es:Copa Libertadores 2006#Final